Miss World Vietnam 2019 was the first edition of the Miss World Vietnam pageant. It was held on August 3, 2019, at Cocobay, Danang, Vietnam.

The pageant was to crown the Vietnam representatives to compete in the beauty pageants of Miss World 2019, Miss International 2019, Miss Grand International and Miss Intercontinental.

Results

Placements
Color keys

§ Voted intop Top 25 by viewers.

Special Awards

Challenge events

Beauty With A Purpose
080 – Dương Thị Ngọc Thoa won Beauty With A Purpose and became the Top 5 of Miss World Vietnam 2019

Top Model

Miss Talent

Miss Sports

Multimedia
355 – Nguyễn Thị Quỳnh Nga won Multimedia and became the Top 25 of Miss World Vietnam 2019

Beach Beauty

Dance of Vietnam
313 – Phan Cẩm Nhi won Dance of Vietnam and became the Top 25 of Miss World Vietnam 2019

Contestants

Top 40 contestants in the final round

References

Beauty pageants in Vietnam
2019 beauty pageants
Vietnamese awards